Hannah Alice Hampton (born 16 November 2000) is an English professional footballer who plays as a goalkeeper for FA Women's Super League club Aston Villa and the England national team. Hampton is a product of the Stoke City and Birmingham City academies and also spent five years as a child in the Villarreal CF youth team.

Early life and career 
Hampton was born in Birmingham, England and grew up in Studley, Warwickshire before emigrating to Spain with her family at the age of five. While in Spain, Hampton was scouted for the Villarreal CF academy where she played as a forward. She studied at the British School of Vila-real where her parents, Chris and Laura, worked as teachers. She moved back to England in 2010 and joined the Stoke City Centre of Excellence. During her time at Stoke, Hampton made the transition from forward to goalkeeper. She is a former pupil of Erasmus Darwin Academy

Club career

Birmingham City 
In 2016, Hampton was recruited for the Birmingham City Centre of Excellence by then-Academy Director Marc Skinner who would later be appointed first-team manager. On 5 November 2017, Skinner called Hampton up for her senior debut in a League Cup group game against Doncaster Belles. After making a string of first team appearances, Hampton signed her first professional contract with the club on 5 December 2018.

In 2018, after the departure of veteran first-choice keeper Ann-Katrin Berger, Hampton saw an increase in playing opportunities, starting 12 of the 20 WSL matches during the 2018–19 season as the Blues conceded a joint-third low 17 league goals. She was subsequently named the club's Young Player of the Season at Birmingham's end of season awards in May 2019.

Hampton signed a new contract for Birmingham City on 5 September 2019, extending her deal until June 2021. She played 34 of the 35 WSL games in the next two seasons, keeping 6 clean sheets with a 66.5% save percentage. On 26 June 2021, it was announced Hampton would be leaving Birmingham upon the expiry of her contract at the end of the month.

Aston Villa 
On 3 July 2021, Hampton signed a two-year contract with FA WSL team Aston Villa on a free transfer.

International career

Youth 
In February 2013, Hampton received her first call-up to the under-15 squad at the age of 12. She was included in the under-17 squad for the 2017 UEFA Women's Under-17 Championship qualification playing host to Lithuania, Slovenia and Russia. The side progressed to the Elite Round, beating Germany and Poland, and drawing to Italy to top the group to qualify for Euro Finals in Czech Republic. England were drawn against Republic Of Ireland, Netherlands and Norway but only won one of their three ties, finishing third and  failing, progress beyond the group stage.

Hampton continued to progress through the under-18 and under-19 age groups. In 2018 she was included in the under-19 squad that contested both the qualifying and elite qualifying rounds, booking their place at 2019 UEFA Women's Under-19 Championship. Hampton recorded two clean sheets in two appearances against Sweden and Italy in the Elite Round at St George's Park National Football Centre and was named Player of the Match against Italy. During the tournament, Hampton played in all three of England's group games as they failed to progress.

In August 2019, Hampton received her first call-up to the under-21 team by Rehanne Skinner to compete in the friendly invitational U23 Nordic Tournament which was hosted at Loughborough University.

Senior 
In February 2020, Hampton was called-up to the England senior team for the first time, as a training playing in the traveling party for the 2020 SheBelieves Cup. On 12 October 2021, Hampton received her first competitive call-up for England's 2023 FIFA World Cup qualifying games against Northern Ireland and Latvia. On 20 February 2022, Hampton made her senior England debut starting England's 0–0 draw with Spain in the 2022 Arnold Clark Cup. Hampton was included in the England squad which won the UEFA Women's Euro 2022 in July 2022.

Personal life 
Hampton was born with strabismus, an eye condition that affects depth perception. By the age of three she had undergone three operations at Birmingham Children's Hospital to try and correct it and is now an ambassador for the hospital. As well as English, she speaks fluent Spanish and also learnt sign language online to be able to communicate with her cousin, Ethan, who is deaf.

Career statistics

Club

International
As of match played 8 April 2022.

Honours
England

UEFA Women's Championship: 2022
Arnold Clark Cup: 2022

Individual 
Birmingham City Young Player of the Season: 2018–19
Birmingham City Player of the Season: 2020–21
Freedom of the City of London (announced 1 August 2022)

References

External links 
 Hannah Hampton  at Birmingham City Women 
 Hannah Hampton at UEFA
  
 Hannah Hampton at The FA
 Hannah Hampton at Aston Villa

2000 births
Living people
English women's footballers
Women's Super League players
Women's association football goalkeepers
Birmingham City W.F.C. players
Aston Villa W.F.C. players
England women's international footballers
UEFA Women's Euro 2022 players
UEFA Women's Championship-winning players